Hotel Bristol, also known as Absalons Gaard after a later owner, is a former hotel located on the City Hall Square in Copenhagen, Denmark.

History

As a hotel

Hotel Bristol was built in two stages. The first two wings, along the City Hall Square and Frederiksberggade, were designed by the architect Vilhelm Fischer, who won an architectural competition, and built from 1901 to 1902 as Hotel Bristol.  In 1932, a third wing, designed by Waldemar Schmidt, was built along Vestergade.

The Hotel Bristol closed in 1917 after a bankruptcy caused by a fire.

Later occupants
After the closure, the building became the new headquarters of Absalon, an insurance company founded in 1909, and changed its name to Absalons Gård (en. House of Absalon). Later the newspaper Aktuelt was based there.

Architecture
The three-wing building is constructed in red brick with granite rustication on the ground storey. The most distinctive feature of the building is its tower which stands 50 metres tall and is capped by a copper roof.

Trotsky and Hotel Bristol
Hotel Bristol provided Leon Trotsky with an alibi following his 1936 Show Trial. Trotsky was accused of plotting against Joseph Stalin at the cafe of the Bristol in Copenhagen where E. S Golzman confessed to meeting both him and his son Sergei Sedov. Danish newspapers could afterwards report that the hotel had been closed since the fire in 1917. The details have been laid out in 'Leon Trotsky and the Hotel Bristol That Never Was', chapter 9, in High Times at the Hotel Bristol, a book about incidents at Hotel Bristols around the world.

Other incidents
 The internationally renowned Danish actor Valdemar Psilander died in the hotel while he stayed there as a guest in 1917.

References

External links
 Copenhagen and Hotel Bristol in the Trotsky trials

Defunct hotels in Copenhagen
Hotel buildings completed in 1902
Hotel buildings completed in 1932
Leon Trotsky